The Social Welfare Decoration was a German Civil Award created by Adolf Hitler on 1 May 1939 for services in the social sector.  The decoration was issued in three classes and was awarded for a wide variety of service, in the social sector, to the German state. Qualifying service would have been with Winterhilfswerk, National Socialist People's Welfare, medical and rescue work, or care of foreign and ethnic Germans. As a replacement for the German Red Cross Decoration, it was conferred in four classes consisting of a white-enameled gold Balkenkreuz with Reich eagle and swastika. A "Medal of Social Welfare" was also issued for lesser degrees of service, not warranting the higher presentation of a class award.

The main requirement for the award was that the service rendered should be to the benefit of the civil population. Reinhard Heydrich was awarded the decoration for his running of the Gestapo in the 1930s and for providing "security" to the German people. The infamous Doctor Josef Mengele was also awarded the decoration in 1941, for providing medical services to wounded soldiers and civilians alike on the battlefields of the Eastern Front.

Holders of the Social Welfare Decoration First Class with Diamonds
Charlotte, Grand Duchess of Luxembourg
Olga, Princess of Yugoslavia
Madame Maria Antonescu of Romania
Elena, Queen of Italy

External links
 Red Cross and Social Welfare Decorations

Bibliography
Christian Zentner, Friedemann Bedürftig (1991). The Encyclopedia of the Third Reich.  Macmillan, New York. 

Orders, decorations, and medals of Nazi Germany